Off with Their Heads is the third studio album by English rock band Kaiser Chiefs, and was released on 20 October 2008 in the UK, and on 25 August 2009 in the United States. The first single from the album was "Never Miss a Beat", released two weeks before the album. The album charted at number two on the UK Albums Chart during the week of 26 October 2008 and at number 16 in the Irish Albums Chart of the week of 24 October.

Background
The album features guest appearances from several artists, including Lily Allen who provides backing vocals on "Always Happens Like That" and "Never Miss a Beat". She previously covered "Oh My God" on her first mixtape and later with Mark Ronson on his album Version. Three members of the English indie band New Young Pony Club also feature on backing vocals on "Never Miss a Beat", Sway DaSafo raps one verse of "Half the Truth", and James Bond composer David Arnold, who performed with the band at 2007's BBC Electric Proms, also appears on the album.

"Never Miss a Beat" and "You Want History" premiered on the band's UK Arena Tour in the Winter of 2007. The lyric "Off with their heads" appears in the first verse of "Like It Too Much". The album was uploaded with 30 second previews of each song, apart from "Never Miss a Beat" which included a full recording, on the music social networking site Last.fm on 9 October 2008. "Never Miss A Beat" appeared on Pro Evolution 2010, as did previous single Ruby, from Yours Truly, Angry Mob.

Reception
Allmusic – 4 stars out of 5 – "The band rails against stupidity and conformity like they did on Yours Truly, Angry Mob, but this time they know that while it's smart to be witty, it's even smarter to be insidiously catchy."
Rolling Stone (p. 126) – 4 stars out of 5 – "Off With Their Heads is great British pop in the dynamic lethal-irony tradition of the mid-Sixties Kinks, the early Jam and, with that vintage-New Wave tone of Nick Baines' keyboards, XTC's 1979 album, Drums and Wires."
Rolling Stone (p. 91) – Ranked #21 in Rolling Stone's 50 Best Albums of 2008.
Alternative Press (p. 146) – 4 stars out of 5 – "'Addicted to Drugs' is brilliant, from its cheeky quotes of Robert Palmer's 'Addicted to Love' to Wilson's darkly comic portrayal of junkies in love."
Mojo (p. 104) – 3 stars out of 5 – "[T]heir third album is again packed with the sort of boisterous melodies and niggling synth-hooks that can top charts and fill stadiums."
Clash (p. 121) – "'Half the Truth' somehow pulls off a charming Blackpool pier sound and even concludes with a little unexpected grime."

Track listing
All tracks written by Kaiser Chiefs.

Personnel
Ricky Wilson – vocals
Andrew White – guitar
Simon Rix – bass
Nick Baines – keyboards
Nick Hodgson – drums, backing vocals, lead vocals on "Remember You're a Girl"
Lily Allen – backing vocals ("Never Miss a Beat"), guest vocals ("Always Happens Like That")
Anne-Marie Chirema – backing vocals ("Never Miss a Beat", "You Want History")
Lou Hayter – backing vocals ("Never Miss a Beat", "You Want History")
Sarah Jones – backing vocals ("Never Miss a Beat", "You Want History")
Thomas Bowes – violin ("Like It Too Much")
Ralph De Souza – violin ("Like It Too Much")
Jonathan Evans-Jones – violin ("Like It Too Much")
Peter Hanson – violin ("Like It Too Much")
Ian Humphries – violin ("Like It Too Much")
Steve Morris – violin ("Like It Too Much")
Helen Paterson – violin ("Like It Too Much")
Tom Pigott-Smith – violin ("Like It Too Much")
Rose Warren-Green – violin ("Like It Too Much")
Debbie Widdup – violin ("Like It Too Much")
Garfield Jackson – viola ("Like It Too Much")
Andy Parker – viola ("Like It Too Much")
Jon Thorne – viola ("Like It Too Much")
Jonathan Williams – cello ("Like It Too Much")
Tony Lewis – cello ("Like It Too Much")
Paul Kegg – cello ("Like It Too Much")
David Lloyd – djembe ("Good Days Bad Days")
Dave Guy – trumpet ("Tomato in the Rain")
Sway DaSafo – guest vocals ("Half the Truth")
Alex Fraser – kettle drum ("Half the Truth")
Mark Ronson – producer, engineer, agogo bells ("Addicted to Drugs")
Eliot James – producer, engineer
Raj Das – assistant engineer
Tim Goalen – assistant engineer ("Never Miss a Beat", "Like It Too Much", "You Want History")
Samuel Navel – assistant engineer
Tom Morris – assistant engineer
Andy Wallace – mixing ("Spanish Metal", "Never Miss a Beat", "You Want History", "Can't Say What I Mean", "Tomato in the Rain", "Half the Truth", "Addicted to Drugs", "Remember You're a Girl")
John O'Mahoney – mix engineer ("Spanish Metal", "Never Miss a Beat", "You Want History", "Can't Say What I Mean", "Tomato in the Rain", "Half the Truth", "Addicted to Drugs", "Remember You're a Girl")
Jan Petrov – mix assistant ("Spanish Metal", "Never Miss a Beat", "You Want History", "Can't Say What I Mean", "Tomato in the Rain", "Half the Truth", "Addicted to Drugs", "Remember You're a Girl")
Cenzo Townshend – mixing ("Like It Too Much", "Good Days Bad Days", "Always Happens Like That")
Neil Comber – mix assistant ("Like It Too Much", "Good Days Bad Days", "Always Happens Like That")
John Davies – mastering
Geoff Foster – strings recording ("Like It Too Much")
Chris Barrett – assistant engineer ("Like It Too Much")
David Arnold – string arrangement ("Like It Too Much")

Charts

Weekly charts

Year-end charts

Certifications

References

2008 albums
Albums produced by Mark Ronson
Kaiser Chiefs albums
B-Unique Records albums